Minio Vallis is an old river valley in the Memnonia quadrangle of Mars, located at 4.3° south latitude and 151.8° west longitude.  It is 88 km long and was named after a classical name for river in Italy.

References

Memnonia quadrangle
Valleys and canyons on Mars